is a former Japanese football player.

Club statistics

References

External links

1985 births
Living people
Ritsumeikan University alumni
Association football people from Osaka Prefecture
People from Takatsuki, Osaka
Japanese footballers
J2 League players
Tokushima Vortis players
FC Osaka players
Association football midfielders